Renuka Singh Saruta (born 5 January 1964) is an Indian politician from Chhattisgarh who currently serving as the current Minister of State for Tribal Affairs of India from 30 May 2019. She is a member of the Bharatiya Janata Party.

Political career
Renuka was first elected to Chhattisgarh Legislative Assembly in 2003 and became Minister of State (Independent Charge) of Woman & Child development and Family welfare in Government of Chhattisgarh and again got re-elected in 2008. In 2013 Assembly election, she lost to senior Congress leader Khelsai Singh. In the 2019 general election, she again contested against Khelsai Singh and won by margin of 1,57,873 votes and became Union Minister of State of Ministry of Tribal Affairs.

References

External links
 Official biographical sketch in Parliament of India website

Living people
People from Surajpur district
Bharatiya Janata Party politicians from Chhattisgarh
India MPs 2019–present
Women members of the Lok Sabha
Narendra Modi ministry
Women members of the Chhattisgarh Legislative Assembly
1964 births
Chhattisgarh MLAs 2003–2008
Chhattisgarh MLAs 2008–2013
Women union ministers of state of India
21st-century Indian women politicians